Pablo Agustín Minissale (born 14 January 2001) is an Argentine professional footballer who plays as a centre-back for Argentinos Juniors.

Career
Minissale joined the youth system of Argentinos Juniors at a young age, having played his very early years in his hometown. He signed his first professional contract with the club on 24 August 2020, as the centre-back penned terms until 31 December 2022. Minissale was soon promoted into the first-team squad under manager Diego Dabove, notably featuring across pre-season; including in friendlies with Boca Juniors and Arsenal de Sarandí. He made a matchday squad for the first time under Gabriel Milito for a Copa de la Liga Profesional away defeat to Rosario Central on 15 February 2021, though he wasn't subbed on.

Minissale's senior debut arrived in the Copa de la Liga on 8 March 2021 at the Estadio Monumental Antonio Vespucio Liberti against River Plate, as he replaced Carlos Quintana after sixty-six minutes of an eventual 1–0 victory.

Career statistics
.

Notes

References

External links

2001 births
Living people
People from José C. Paz Partido
Argentine people of Italian descent
Argentine footballers
Association football defenders
Argentine Primera División players
Argentinos Juniors footballers
Sportspeople from Buenos Aires Province